The Peratrovich Formation is a geologic formation in Alaska. It preserves fossils dating back to the Carboniferous period.

See also

 List of fossiliferous stratigraphic units in Alaska
 Paleontology in Alaska

References
 

Carboniferous Alaska
Carboniferous southern paleotropical deposits